Engineering is the discipline, art, skill and profession in which a knowledge of the mathematical and natural sciences gained by study, experience, and practice is applied with judgment to develop ways to utilise, economically, the materials and forces of nature for the benefits of the human society. One who practices engineering is called an engineer, the word "Engineer" is generally stereotyped with a person skilled in the principles and practice of any branch of engineering.

In Delhi there are several Engineering Institutions which provide 4 or 5 year B.tech/B.E. degree courses.

This is a list of Engineering Institutions present in Delhi.

See also

[[Engineering & Management Institute of India
]]
Delhi
Email id

Notes and references
Notes

 Institute was established in 2000 and approved by AICTE and recognised by UGC on 11 May 2006.
 Delhi College of Engineering was established as Delhi Polytechnic in 1941. In 1962, the administration of Delhi Polytechnic was taken over from Ministry of Education, to Delhi State and it was renamed as "Delhi College of Engineering" in 1965. In 2009 college was converted to a state (public) university and has been rechristened "Delhi Technological University".

References

 
Delhi
engineering